Titanic Lifeboat No. 1''' was a lifeboat from the steamship . It was the fifth boat launched to sea, over an hour after the liner collided with an iceberg and began sinking on 14 April 1912.  With a capacity of 40 people, it was launched with only 12 aboard, the fewest to escape in any one boat that night.

 Description 
Boat No. 1 was one of two small "emergency" wooden cutters that were located one on each side of the Titanic; No. 1 was on the starboard side. Although they performed double-duty as lifeboats, their primary purpose was to serve the crew in the event of an emergency, such as a man overboard, and were therefore already swung out from the rail to be launched quickly.  Each standard clinker-built lifeboat on the ship had a capacity of 65, while the smaller emergency boat's capacity was 40.

 History
The lifeboat had a capacity of 40 people, but was launched with only 12 aboard, the fewest to escape in any one boat that night. Most of the occupants of Boat 1 were men, despite Captain Smith's call for "women and children first." First Officer Murdoch, in charge of the evacuation effort on the ship's starboard side, allowed a number of First-Class male passengers to board lifeboats. Murdoch permitted five passengers and seven crewmembers to board Boat 1. The passengers included Sir Cosmo Duff Gordon; his wife Lucy, Lady Duff Gordon; her secretary, Mabel Francatelli; Abraham Salomon and C. E. Henry Stengel. The crewmen were Lookout George Symons, whom Murdoch placed in charge of the craft, Charles Hendrickson, Samuel Collins, George Taylor, Frederick Sheath, Robert Pusey and Albert Horswill.

Boat No. 1 did not clear the side of the ship for some time, perhaps not until about 1:15 am, owing to a mishap encountered on its descent from the boat deck. A protuberance called a spar, at about the B-Deck level, caught on the boat's gunwales, arresting the lowering process. It was not until the crew used a wire cutter to chop the obstacle away that the boat was freed and able to reach the sea.

Boat No. 1 and its occupants were picked up by the  sometime shortly after 4:10 am, being the second Titanic lifeboat to reach the rescue ship. The boat's occupants were subsequently photographed as a group on the Carpathia.  The boat was hoisted aboard the Carpathia along with other Titanic lifeboats and brought to New York. One of the davits from which Boat 1 was lowered remains upright on the wreck of the Titanic in relatively good condition.

Due to rumors that Sir Cosmo had bribed the crew in his boat not to rescue people left in the water after the ship went down, some New York press reports dubbed Boat 1 the "Money Boat". The appearance of Cosmo and Lucy Duff Gordon as witnesses at the British investigation into the disaster drew the largest crowds seen during the inquiry.

Controversy

According to the British Inquiry testimony of crew member Charles Hendrickson, he had proposed returning to rescue survivors after the Titanic sank, but "the women objected." Consequently, he claimed, the boat did not go back to pick up swimmers, although he admitted there was "plenty of room for another dozen". It was also claimed during the course of the inquiry by crewman George Symons and others that it was Lucy Duff Gordon who expressed concern that the lifeboat might be swamped if it returned. She denied the charge and her testimony was supported by other crewmembers who revealed they had not heard her objection nor any proposal to turn back.

According to the testimony of Robert Pusey, a conversation concerning money occurred in the boat at about 3 a.m., nearly an hour after the Titanic sank.  He claimed the discussion was prompted by a private comment Lucy Duff Gordon made to Mabel Francatelli: "There is your beautiful nightdress gone." Overhearing the exchange, Pusey replied, "Never mind, you have saved your lives," afterwards complaining that he and the other sailors had not only lost everything but their pay had stopped from the time the ship went down; to which Cosmo Duff Gordon responded, "I will give you a fiver each to start a new kit." On 16 April, the day after their rescue by the Carpathia, each Boat 1 crew member received a £5 cheque from Cosmo Duff Gordon.

The British inquiry issued a report after reviewing the evidence of their probe, which included sworn testimony from every member of Boat 1's crew as well as an affidavit from Mabel Francatelli.  The report stated:
  The very gross charge against Sir Cosmo Duff Gordon that, having got into No. 1 boat, he bribed the men in it to row away from the drowning people, is unfounded.The report, however, admonished the occupants of Boat 1 for not making an effort to rescue survivors from the water.

Occupants

 Boat 1 in popular culture 
In a deleted scene in James Cameron's 1997 film Titanic, Sir Cosmo Duff Gordon (Martin Jarvis) and Lady Duff Gordon (Rosalind Ayres) are shown seated in Lifeboat No. 1 when Fireman Hendrickson recommends rescuing people in the water. Sir Cosmo looks at his wife, who appears distressed, before replying, "It's out of the question."

In the 2012 television mini-series Titanic, Lady Duff Gordon (Sylvestra Le Touzel) is shown standing in Boat 1, urging her secretary to get in with her, saying, "Don't be a fool Francatelli, this boat isn't sinking, that one is," pointing to the ship.  She is later shown telling Officer Murdoch to allow some men to board, including her husband, then ordering him to lower the boat.

The loading and launching of Boat 1, and the occupants' decision not to return to the wreck site after the Titanics sinking, was also portrayed in the 1958 film A Night to Remember'', based on Walter Lord's namesake book. Miss Francatelli (who was still alive at the time) was completely omitted.

See also
Lifeboats of the Titanic
Passengers of the Titanic
Crew of the Titanic

References 
Notes

Sources

External links
Witness testimony of Boat 1 occupants, from Titanic Inquiry Project

British Wreck Commissioner's Inquiry
Day 5:   Charles Hendrickson;  & Day 10:  recalled
Day 10:  George Symons
Day 10:   Albert E. J. Horswell
Day 10:   Sir Cosmo Duff-Gordon;  & Day 11:   recalled
Day 11:   Robert W. Pusey
Day 11:   Lady Duff-Gordon
Day 11:   Samuel Collins
Day 11: James Taylor
Day 11:   Frederick Sheath

United States Senate Inquiry
Day 7:    George Symons;  &  (Together with two others)
Day 11:   Charles E. Stengel

RMS Titanic
Lifeboats